The 4 x 1500 metres relay is an athletics track event in which teams comprise four runners who each complete 1500 metres or 3.75 laps on a standard 400 metre track.

While not a World Championship or Olympic event, the IAAF does ratify world records in the event. The men's world record is 14:22.22 by a Kenyan team of Collins Cheboi, Silas Kiplagat, James Magut and Asbel Kiprop, set on May 25, 2014 at the World Relays meet in Nassau, Bahamas. The women's world record is 16:27.02 by an American team of Colleen Quigley, Elise Cranny, Karissa Schweizer and Shelby Houlihan set on July 31, 2020 at the Bowerman Track Club Intrasquad IV meet in Portland, Oregon.

In the United States and other countries, the 4 × mile relay is sometimes run as an alternative.

All-time top

Men
Correct as of September 2022.

Women
Correct as of May 2022.

References

 
Events in track and field
Track relay races